Welcome To Winners is the second album by the English band Lowgold, released in 2003.

The album was again produced by former Elliott Smith associate Tony Lash and two singles were lifted from the album. The Times described the album as a "minor masterpiece".

Track listing
All songs written by Darren Lee Ford except "Quiet Times", "Famous Last Words" and "Save Yourself" written by Dan Symons.

"Quiet Times"
"We Don't Have Much Time"
"The Same Way"
"Let Me Into Yours"
"Means To An End"
"Just A Ride"
"Keep Your Gun Dry"
"Famous Last Words"
"Clear The Skies"
"Fade Down"
"Save Yourself"

UK singles
"We Don't Have Much Time" (2003)
"The Same Way" (2003)

Personnel
 Tony Lash – producer, drums
 Darren Ford – vocals, guitar, drums
 Dan Symons – guitar
 Miles Willey – bass guitar

References

2003 albums
Lowgold albums
Sanctuary Records albums